This is a list of eponymously named airports.

It includes the name of the airport, the facility's location, and the person after whom the airport is named.

Current airports

Former names and names of closed airports
Astor Piazzolla International Airport, Mar del Plata, Argentina formerly Brigadier General Bartolomé de la Colina International Airport, changed in August, 2008
Baghdad International Airport, Baghdad, Iraq  formerly Saddam International Airport, named for Saddam Hussein
Bole International Airport, Addis Ababa, Ethiopia  formerly Haile Selassie I International Airport, named for Haile Selassie I of Ethiopia
 Buyant-Ukhaa International Airport, Ulan Bator, Mongolia  formerly Chinggis Khaan International Airport,  which is given to a new airport
Cape Town International Airport, Cape Town, South Africa  formerly D.F. Malan Airport, named for Daniel François Malan
Clark International Airport, Clark Freeport Zone, Philippines  formerly Diosdado Macapagal International Airport, named for Diosdado Macapagal
Doncaster Sheffield Airport  formerly Robin Hood Airport Doncaster Sheffield
Durban International Airport, Durban, South Africa  formerly Louis Botha Airport, named for Louis Botha; renamed in 1995 and closed in 2010
Edmonton City Centre (Blatchford Field) Airport, Edmonton, Alberta, Canada closed, named for Kenneth Alexander Blatchford 
El Alto International Airport, La Paz, Bolivia formerly John F. Kennedy International Airport
José Joaquín de Olmedo International Airport, Guayaquil, Ecuador  formerly Simón Bolívar International Airport, named for Simón Bolívar
Haluoleo Airport, Kendari, Southeast Sulawesi, Indonesia  formerly Wolter Monginsidi Airport, named for Robert Wolter Mongisidi
Kai Tak Airport, Hong Kong, People's Republic of China  closed, named after two plutocrats Kai Ho and Au Tak
Kimberley Airport, Kimberley, Northern Cape, South Africa  formerly B. J. Vorster Airport, named for B. J. Vorster
Meigs Field, Chicago, Illinois, United States  closed, named for Merrill C. Meigs
Mati Airport, Mati City, Philippines formerly Imelda R. Marcos Airport
OR Tambo International Airport, Johannesburg, South Africa  formerly Jan Smuts International Airport, named for Jan Smuts
Reno–Tahoe International Airport  formerly Cannon International Airport named for senator Howard W. Cannon
Senai International Airport, Johor Bahru, Malaysia  formerly Sultan Ismail International Airport
Stapleton International Airport, Denver, Colorado, United States  closed, named for Denver mayor Benjamin F. Stapleton
Taiwan Taoyuan International Airport, Taoyuan, Taiwan  formerly Chiang Kai-shek International Airport, named for Chiang Kai-shek
Velana International Airport, Maldives  formerly Ibrahim Nasir International Airport, named for Ibrahim Nasir and renamed in 2017, after the family house name of Ibrahim Nasir

See also
List of eponyms
List of places named after people
List of airports

References

Airports